Llandudwen  is a former civil parish in the Welsh county of Gwynedd.  It was abolished in 1934, and divided between Buan and Tudweiliog.

References

Buan, Gwynedd